Song Jong-sun ( or  ; born 11 March 1981 in North Korea) is a North Korean female football player (defender) who plays for Amnokkang Sports Club.

Song has made several appearances for the North Korea women's national football team, including playing at the 2003 and 2007 FIFA Women's World Cup. She also played at the 2008 Summer Olympics. In July 2011, she, along with other members of the national team, tested positive for a banned steroid, and were subsequently banned for 14 months from international competitions by FIFA.

References

1981 births
Living people
Sportspeople from Pyongyang
North Korean women's footballers
Olympic footballers of North Korea
2003 FIFA Women's World Cup players
2007 FIFA Women's World Cup players
Footballers at the 2008 Summer Olympics
2011 FIFA Women's World Cup players
Doping cases in association football
North Korean sportspeople in doping cases
Asian Games medalists in football
Footballers at the 2002 Asian Games
Footballers at the 2006 Asian Games
Footballers at the 2010 Asian Games
North Korea women's international footballers
Asian Games gold medalists for North Korea
Asian Games silver medalists for North Korea
Women's association football defenders
Medalists at the 2002 Asian Games
Medalists at the 2006 Asian Games
Medalists at the 2010 Asian Games